Girl Authority is the debut cover album by pop girl group Girl Authority. The album is a cover album of previous hit songs by other female solo singers and girl groups, with the exception of two songs, originally recorded by Smokey Robinson & the Miracles and ABBA. The album peaked at No. 167 on the Billboard 200 albums chart, No. 9 on the Billboard Top Kid Audio chart (a chart that records sales of children's music albums)and No. 5 on their Top Heatseekers chart.

Track listing
"Hollaback Girl"  – 3:21 (Hugo, Stefani, Williams) (Gwen Stefani)
"Hit Me with Your Best Shot"  – 2:58 (Schwartz) (Pat Benatar)
"Material Girl"  – 3:51 (Brown, Rans) (Madonna)
"Pon de Replay"  – 3:39 (Brooks, Nobles, Rogers, Sturken)
"Beautiful"  (Perry)
"Don't Worry 'Bout a Thing"  – 3:34 (Deere, Osborn)
"Dancing Queen"  – 3:36  (Andersson, Anderson, Ulvaeus)
"Get the Party Started"  – 3:11 (Perry)
"Shop Around"  – 3:18 (Gordy, Robinson)
"I Love Rock N' Roll"  – 2:53 (Mamburg, Sachs) (Joan Jett)
"Karma"  – 4:16 - (Augello, Brothers, Cook, Smith)
"Girls Just Want to Have Fun"  – 3:35 (Hazard) (Cyndi Lauper)
"Leave (Get Out)"  – 4:03 (Cantrall, Kenneth, Schack, White) (Jojo)
"Breakaway"  (Benenate, Gerrard, Lavigne)
"We Got the Beat"  – 2:32 (Caffey) (The Go Go's)

Critical response
Marisa Brown of AllMusic called the album "too much too bear", criticizing "the fact that many of the songs are thematically inappropriate for kids" and "the semi-talented yet extremely puerile interpretations, with the intermittent giggling and nasally tag-team-like vocals".

References

Girl Authority albums
2006 debut albums
Covers albums
Zoë Records albums